The 43M Turán III or 44M Turán III was a Hungarian medium tank of World War II. It was based on the 41M Turán II medium tank, but equipped with a significantly larger turret compared to its predecessors, and a long-barrelled 75 mm anti-tank gun.

Development 

As the war progressed, the 41M Turán heavy medium tank also became obsolete quickly. To increase the firepower of the Turán tanks further more, the Zrínyi assault guns armed with a long 75 or short 105 mm cannon, a widely regarded successful design was developed on the chassis. The other attempt was redesigning the turret as a whole, and mounting the 43M 7.5 cm tank gun (the same used on the 44M Zrínyi I).

Two 43M 75 mm tank guns were manufactured, these were built into what later became called the Turán III and into the Zrínyi I. The Hungarian 7.5 cm 43M was developed from the blueprints of the German 7.5 cm Panzerabwehrkanone, though not a direct copy, and then converted into a tank gun.

The armor of the vehicle was also reinforced to around 75-95 mm on the front of the turret and the hull, which further increased the weight and slowed the vehicle down even more.

Production 
The vehicle was produced as one prototype and one fully functioning vehicle for the trials. The Turán III with the actual turret was finished in February 1944. Ground and shooting tests were then carried out. However, no more 43M Turáns (Turán III or Turán 75 long) were constructed because of the lack of materials and the fact that after the Occupation of Hungary in March 1944, Germany did not allow further tank and gun productions, and restricted the Hungarian industry to only spare part manufacturing level. However, this was circumvented most likely in the case of the 44M Tas's development.

Service 
After the successful trials, the variant was accepted for service designated as 43M Turán. There are no records indicating if it did or did not serve in combat and the fate of the Turán III is unknown.

See also 
Related development

 40/41M Turán I/II – Hungarian medium tanks from which the Turán III was developed
 44M Zrínyi I – Hungarian tank destroyer with the same gun and hull
 Tanks of comparable role, performance, and era

 44M Tas – Hungarian medium/heavy tank
 A27M Cromwell – British medium/cruiser tank
 Carro Armato P.43 – Italian medium/heavy tank proposal
 M4 Sherman – American medium tank
 Panzer IV – German medium tank
 T-34-85 – Soviet medium tank

Notes

References 

 
 
 
 
 

Tanks of Hungary
World War II medium tanks
Military vehicles introduced from 1940 to 1944